ESPN Inc. is an American multinational sports media conglomerate majority-owned by The Walt Disney Company, with Hearst Communications as an equity stakeholder.

Headed by James Pitaro, it owns and operates local and global cable and satellite television variants of ESPN, ESPN Radio, ESPN.com and other related ventures.

Commonly and colloquially marketed as the "Worldwide Leader in Sports", programming on its television networks include broadcasts of live or tape-delayed sporting events and sports-related programming including talk shows and original documentary series and films.

History

ESPN Inc. was founded in 1979 by Bill Rasmussen, initially as an attempt to broadcast Connecticut sports over an "Entertainment and Sports Programming Network" (ESPN) cable channel, and soon became a nationwide cable sports network.  Shortly after being terminated as the World Hockey Association's New England Whalers communications director in 1978, Rasmussen conceived of a plan to produce Connecticut sports events for Connecticut cable systems. With his son, Scott, they had moved beyond that, considering a national sports channel doable. RCA had an underused satellite and was pushing for customers. Finding it cheaper by the hour to rent a satellite transponder full-time, instead of 5 hours a day, the Rasmussens changed their plans from creating a Connecticut sports channel to creating a national cable network.  

On February 7, 1979, Bill Rasmussen got the NCAA to agree, in principle, to grant ESPN broadcast rights for NCAA sports. The next day at the Texas Cable Show exposition, he was able to get cable companies on board. An advertising contract with Anheuser-Busch was in talks at that time, and Getty Oil came on board as its major source of capital. In 1979, Rasmussen purchased the first acre of land for ESPN's headquarters in Bristol, Connecticut. With a reasonable payment plan in July 1979, Rasmussen leased RCA's Satcom 1 transponder using his credit card.  Anheuser-Busch became a major sponsor, signing a $1.4 million ad contract, a record at the time. Getty Oil invested $10 million into ESPN getting a controlling stake in 1979.

On September 7, 1979, the ESPN cable channel went on the air, with 24 hours of programming on the weekends and limited hours during the week. 625 cable system affiliates were signed up at launch and they had one million household subscribed total (out of 20 million households with cable). The channel's first game featured the Milwaukee Schlitz and the Kentucky Bourbons in the deciding game of the championship series of the American Professional Slo-Pitch League.

In 1980, the company was named in a Texas divorce filing. Groundbreaking for its headquarters took place one year earlier. Full-time broadcasting began in September 1980. Additional programming at the time included weekly boxing matches.

NBC Sports President Chet Simmons was hired to help run the cable channel. Simmons and Rasmussen were at odds with Getty Oil executives siding with Simmons. At the end of 1980, Rasmussen was removed as company president by Getty Oil executive for ESPN, Stuart Evey, relegating him to a ceremonial role. Rasmussen left in 1981 and sold his remaining stock in 1984.

Investing another $15 million into the company and no profits expected any time soon, Getty used management consultant McKinsey & Co. to assess ESPN's future. McKinsey's lead consultant was Roger Werner, who figured with another $120 million and five years ESPN would become a profit maker. Werner soon was hired by ESPN as vice-president of finance, administration, and planning and developed a new business plan. Werner developed a new revenue source beyond advertising by initiating revolutionary affiliate fees paid by the cable operators by number of subscribers starting at 6 cents. Between CBS Cable folding in October 1982 and the new CEO, Bill Grimes, they convinced most of the reluctant cable providers to pay. By 1985, the fee was 10 cents.

ESPN was the largest cable channel by the end of 1983 with 28.5 million households. Also in 1983, the company began distributing programming outside the United States. Getty Oil, Anheuser-Busch and the NCAA all got involved with the new cable channel. In 1984, the U.S. ABC television network purchased a controlling stake in the company. ABC later merged with Capital Cities Communications, and the combined company was purchased by The Walt Disney Company in 1995.

Multichannel

ESPN started out expanding into other nations and additional channels. The ESPN International unit was formed in 1988 to start channels in other nations beginning with ESPN Latin America in 1989. In 1992, ESPN Asia was launched. ESPN partnered with TF1 and Canal+ for a made over Eurosport to enter Europe.

RJR Nabisco sold its 20% stake in ESPN to the Hearst Corporation. Werner resigned as CEO and president in October 1990 for another sports CEO job. Steve Bornstein replaced him in the CEO post moving up from the second position of executive vice-president in charge of programming and production.

With ABC Radio Network, the company started the ESPN Radio Network in 1991 with programming 16 hours per week. Ohlmeyer Communications' sports programming division was purchased in March 1993. ESPN launched ESPN2 on October 1, 1993 at 7:30 PM. The channel at the time was targeting those age 18-34. In 1994, ESPN acquired Creative Sports and from Dow Jones an 80% stake in SportsTicker.

In 1997, ESPN acquired the Classic Sports Network.

In 2006, ESPN acquired the North American Sports Network (NASN). It was re-branded as ESPN America on February 1, 2009.

In February 2016, ESPN and Tencent reached an agreement of collaboration. ESPN's content would be localized and exclusively distributed and promoted by Tencent's digital platforms in China, including college basketball games, the X Games and an ESPN section on QQ.com. In August 2016, Disney purchased a 1/3 stake in BAMTech for $1 billion from MLB Advanced Media with the option to purchase a majority share, which it later exercised, and now owns 85%. Disney purchased the stake to first develop an ESPN-branded subscription streaming service, later named ESPN+.

Executives
 James Pitaro – Chairman
 Chara-Lynn Aguiar – Senior Vice President, Strategy & Office of the Chairman
 Sonia Coleman – Senior Vice President, Human Resources
 Justin Connolly – President, Disney Platform Distribution
 Eleanor "Nell" DeVane – Chief Counsel
 Rosalyn Durant – Executive Vice President, Programming & Acquisitions
 Rita Ferro – President, Disney Advertising
 Laura Gentile – Executive Vice President, Marketing
 Thomas Hennessy – Senior Vice President, Finance
 Luke Kang, President, Asia Pacific
 Rob King – Executive Editor-In-Chief, Special Projects
 Aaron LaBerge – Chief Technology Officer
 Chris LaPlaca – Senior Vice President, Corporate Communications
 Diego Lerner, President, The Walt Disney Company Latin America
 K Madhavan, President, The Walt Disney Company India
 Burke Magnus – President, Content
 Kaitee Daley – Vice President, Social Media
 Stephanie Druley – Executive Vice President, Event and Studio Production
 Brian Lockhart – Senior Vice President, ESPN+ Original Content and ESPN Films
 David Roberts – Head of NBA & Studio Production
 Norby Williamson – Executive Vice President, Event and Studio Production & Executive Editor
 Tina Thornton – Head of Content Ops and Creative Surround
 Mark L. Walker – Head of Sports Business Development & Innovation
 Russell Wolff – Executive Vice President and General Manager, ESPN+

Assets

Television 
ACC Network (2019–present) 
ESPN (1979–present)
ESPN International (1989–present)
ESPN2 (1993–present)
ESPNews (1996–present)
ESPN Classic (1997–2021)
ESPN PPV (1999–present)
ESPN Films (2001–present)
ESPN Deportes (2004–present)
ESPNU (2005–present)
ESPN Goal Line & Bases Loaded (2010–2020)
ESPN Events (1996-present), also called ESPN Regional Television
Longhorn Network (2011–present, joint venture with The University of Texas at Austin and IMG College)
SEC Network (2014–present)

Radio
ESPN Radio (1992–present)
ESPN Deportes Radio (2005–2019)
ESPN Xtra (2008–present)
LRI710 ESPN 107.9 (2010–Present)
KRDC (since 2021)

Internet
ESPN.com (1993–present), flagship site
ESPN3 (2005–present), known as ESPN360.com from 2005–2010
ESPN Motion (2003–present), broadband video
WatchESPN (2011–2019), known as ESPN Networks from 2010–2011
ESPN+ (2018–present), subscription streaming service available in the US
Star+ (2021–present) subscription streaming service available in Latin America.
ESPN Player, subscription streaming service available in select international markets
Andscape (formerly The Undefeated) (2016-present), describes itself as “the premier platform for exploring the intersections of race, sports and culture.
 espnW.com, focusing on women
ESPN.mobi, mobile site
ESPN Deportes.com (2000-present), Spanish language
ESPN FC (1995-present), soccer, formerly ESPN Soccernet
ESPNF1.com, Formula 1
ESPNcricinfo (1993-present), cricket
ESPNScrum.com, rugby union
EXPN.com, extreme sports
ESPNBoston.com, operates in conjunction with Entercom-owned WEEI AM
ESPNChicago.com, the site for Good Karma Brands-owned (former ESPN O&O) WMVP
ESPNCleveland.com, joint site for Good Karma Brands-owned WKNR and WWGK
ESPNDallas.com
ESPNLosAngeles.com
ESPNNewYork.com, joint site for Emmis Communications-owned WEPN-FM and Good Karma Brands-owned (former ESPN O&O) WEPN (AM)
ESPNWisconsin.com, joint site for Good Karma Brands-owned WAUK/Waukesha-Milwaukee and WTLX/Monona-Madison

Canada

Under the Canadian Radio-television and Telecommunications Commission's rules regarding foreign broadcasters, ESPN has been prohibited from acquiring majority ownership of any channel operating in Canada. Instead, ESPN partnered with several Canadian firms to form a privately held consortium named NetStar Communications in 1995, which then acquired the sports networks TSN and RDS. These Canadian partners then sold their shares in 2001 to CTV Inc. (now Bell Media). ESPN continues to own 20 percent of what is now CTV Specialty Television while Bell Media owns the remaining 80 percent.

The sports channels owned by the CTV Specialty Television subsidiary:
TSN – five feeds
RDS
RDS2
RDS Info
ESPN Classic

Through CTV Specialty Television, ESPN also has an indirect interest in several channels operated in partnership with Warner Bros. Discovery, but ESPN is not believed to be directly involved with these operations.

United Kingdom

In 2006, ESPN acquired the North American Sports Network (NASN), later re-branded as ESPN America in 2008. ESPN launched a domestic channel in the United Kingdom after acquiring a portion of the local rights package to the Premier League alongside Sky Sports, replacing the now-collapsed Setanta Sports. The contract lasted from the 2009–10 season to the 2012–13 season. However, by 2012, the network had begun to lose many of its key sports rights, including the Premier League, to BT Group.

On January 25, 2013, ESPN reached a deal to sell its television business in the United Kingdom and Ireland, including ESPN America's programming rights, to BT Group. The ESPN channel in the United Kingdom was placed under the control of BT Sport, while ESPN Classic and ESPN America shut down. ESPN continues to operate digital properties targeting the United Kingdom, including its ESPN.co.uk, ESPN FC, ESPNcricinfo, and ESPNscrum websites. Two years later, ESPN reached a long-term deal with BT Sport for the British rights to ESPN original programming and international event rights.

Other
ESPY Awards (1993–present)
ESPN The Magazine (1998–2019)
The ESPN Sports Poll (1994–present)
ESPN Broadband (2002–present)
ESPN Books (2004–present)
ESPNU.com (2005–present)
ESPN Deportes La Revista (2005–present)
ESPN Integration (2006–present)
ESPN Online Games (2006–present)
ESPN Wide World of Sports Complex (2010–present)
College football bowl games owned by ESPN Events
X Games (1995–present)
ESPN The Games (1999–2002), joint venture with Konami and Disney Interactive
ESPN Videogames (2003–2005), joint venture with Sega

See also
ESPN on ABC (formerly ABC Sports)
A+E Networks, also co-owned by Disney and Hearst
Walt Disney Television

References

 
Bristol, Connecticut
Mass media companies established in 1979
Hearst Communications assets
Joint ventures
Companies based in Hartford County, Connecticut
Disney Media Networks
Cable network groups in the United States
1979 establishments in Connecticut

ms:ESPN